John Arthur Underwood Jr. (March 27, 1901 - December 15, 1932) was an American football guard who played two seasons with the Milwaukee Badgers of the National Football League. He played college football at Rice University and attended Honey Grove High School in Honey Grove, Texas.

See also
List of Milwaukee Badgers players

References

External links
Just Sports Stats
Fanbase profile

1901 births
1932 deaths
Players of American football from Texas
American football offensive guards
Rice Owls football players
Milwaukee Badgers players
People from Honey Grove, Texas